The Drama Desk Award for Outstanding Actress in a Musical is an annual award presented by Drama Desk in recognition of achievements in the theatre among Broadway, Off Broadway and Off-Off Broadway productions. The awards were established in 1955, with acting awards being given without making distinctions between roles in plays and musicals, or actors and actresses. The new award categories were later created in the 1975 ceremony.

Winners and nominees

1960s

1970s

1980s

1990s

2000s

2010s

2020s

Multiple Winners

 3 wins
 Patti LuPone
 Donna Murphy
 Bernadette Peters

 2 wins
 Sutton Foster
 Angela Lansbury
 Audra McDonald
 Jessie Mueller
 Chita Rivera

Multiple nominees

 8 nominations
 Bernadette Peters

 7 nominations
 Sutton Foster
 Donna Murphy

 6 nominations
 Patti LuPone

 4 nominations
 LaChanze
 Kelli O'Hara
 Faith Prince
 Sherie Rene Scott

 3 nominations
 Kate Baldwin
 Stephanie J. Block
 Kristin Chenoweth
 Christine Ebersole
 Angela Lansbury
 Audra McDonald
 Idina Menzel
 Jessie Mueller
 Chita Rivera

 2 nominations
 Laura Benanti
 Laura Bell Bundy
 Carolee Carmello
 Victoria Clark
 Melissa Errico
 Beth Fowler
 Terri Klausner
 Beth Leavel
 Dorothy Loudon
 Marin Mazzie
 Lonette McKee
 Laura Osnes
 Alice Ripley
 Daphne Rubin-Vega
 Karen Ziemba

See also
 Laurence Olivier Award for Best Actress in a Musical
 Tony Award for Best Performance by a Leading Actress in a Musical

References
 
  2002 New York Times article

External links
 Drama Desk official website

Musical Actress
Awards for actresses
Theatre acting awards